Dumisani Mpofu (born 20 December 1973) is a retired Zimbabwean football defender. A Zimbabwe international, he played at the 1999, 2001, 2003 and 2004 and 2004 African Cup of Nations.

References 

1973 births
Living people
Zimbabwean footballers
Zimbabwe international footballers
Association football defenders
Zimbabwean expatriate footballers
Expatriate soccer players in South Africa
Zimbabwean expatriate sportspeople in South Africa
CAPS United players
Bush Bucks F.C. players
Western Province United F.C. players